The 2016 Guangzhou R&F season is the 6th year in Guangzhou R&F's existence and its 5th season in the Chinese football league, also its 6th season in the top flight.

Coaching and medical staff

{|class="wikitable"
|-
!Position
!Staff
|-
|Head coach|| Dragan Stojković
|-
|rowspan="2"|Assistant coaches|| Žarko Đurović
|-
| Dejan Govedarica
|-
|Fitness coach|| Katsuhito Kinoshi
|-
|Goalkeeper coach|| Huang Hongtao
|-
|Team leader|| Huang Jun
|-
|rowspan="2"|Team physicians|| Jin Ri
|-
| Fan Bihua
|-
|Physiotherapist|| Enrique Pascual Muñoz
|-
|Performance manager|| Bito Wu
|-
|rowspan="3"|Interpreters|| Hong Wenjie
|-
| Weng Zhanhong
|-
| Piao Jun
|-

Squad

Winter
As of 1 March 2016.

Summer
As of 4 September 2016.

Competitions

Chinese Super League

Table

Results by round

Results summary

League matches

Chinese FA Cup

References

Chinese football clubs 2016 season
Guangzhou City F.C. seasons